Kinsey may refer to:

Kinsey (surname)
Alfred Kinsey
the Kinsey Reports, a pair of books on sexuality by Alfred Kinsey.
the Kinsey scale of sexual orientation, invented by Alfred Kinsey, or person's orientation as measured on that scale, as in "Kinsey 6"
the Kinsey Institute for Research in Sex, Gender and Reproduction, founded by Alfred Kinsey
Kinsey (documentary), a 2005 film aired on the PBS series American Experience
Kinsey (film), a 2004 biographical film about Alfred Kinsey, written and directed by Bill Condon
Kinsey Millhone, the heroine in Sue Grafton's "alphabet mysteries" of books
Kinsey (TV series), a former British TV programme
Kinsey, Alabama, a town in the United States
Kinsey, Indiana, an unincorporated community in the United States
Kinsey, Montana, an unincorporated community in the United States
Kinsey, Ohio, an unincorporated community in the United States
The Kinsey Sicks, a comic a cappella quartet

See also
Kinsley (disambiguation)
McKinsey (disambiguation)